Birley Glacier is a glacier, at least  long, flowing west into the eastern extremity of Barilari Bay north of Vardun Point, on the west coast of Graham Land. First seen and roughly surveyed in 1909 by the French Antarctic Expedition under Jean-Baptiste Charcot, it was re-surveyed in 1935–36 by the British Graham Land Expedition (BGLE) under John Rymill, and later named for Kenneth P. Birley, who contributed toward the cost of the BGLE, 1934–37.

See also
 List of glaciers in the Antarctic
 Glaciology

References 

 

Glaciers of Graham Coast